Chen Yan (born May 2, 1979 in Nanjing, Jiangsu) is a former Chinese swimmer. She won the bronze medal in the 4×100 m medley relay at 1996 Summer Olympics. At the 1997 FINA Short Course World Championships she won the gold medal in the 200 m backstroke and the silver medal in the 100 m backstroke. She failed a drug test at 1998 Asian Games and was suspended from competition for four years.

References

1978 births
Living people
Swimmers from Jiangsu
Chinese female backstroke swimmers
Olympic swimmers of China
Sportspeople from Nanjing
Swimmers at the 1996 Summer Olympics
Doping cases in swimming
Olympic bronze medalists in swimming
Medalists at the FINA World Swimming Championships (25 m)
Medalists at the 1996 Summer Olympics
Olympic bronze medalists for China

Nanjing Sport Institute alumni